Creature Venture is a 1980 video game published by Highlands Computer Services.

Gameplay
Creature Venture is a game in which the player must find the treasure of the haunted Stashbuck mansion. Creature Venture was one of the first games to use animation in adventuring.

Reception
William Zurfluh reviewed the game for Computer Gaming World, and stated that "It will provide many hours of challenging entertainment for even the seasoned expert. In conclusion I would recommend Creature Venture for either the novice or expert. I do not think you will be disappointed."

References

External links
Softalk
Electronic Fun
Review in Creative Computing
Entry in The Book of Adventure Games

1980 video games
1980s horror video games
Adventure games
Apple II games
Apple II-only games
Video games developed in the United States